The Samsung Galaxy Z Flip (sold as Samsung Galaxy Flip in certain territories) is an Android-based foldable smartphone developed by Samsung Electronics as part of the Samsung Galaxy Z series. Its existence was first revealed in an advertisement during the 2020 Academy Awards. Unveiled alongside the Galaxy S20 on February 11, 2020, it was released on February 14, 2020. Unlike the Galaxy Z Fold, the device folds horizontally and uses a hybrid glass coating branded as "Infinity Flex Display". It is available in three colors for the LTE version (Mirror Purple, Mirror Black, and Mirror Gold) and two colors for the 5G version (Mystic Bronze and Mystic Gray). The 5G version was also made available in a limited-edition "Mystic White" color.

Specifications

Design 
The Galaxy Z Flip is constructed with an aluminum frame, and -thick "ultra-thin glass" with a plastic layer similar to the Galaxy Fold, manufactured by Samsung with materials from Schott AG, which is "produced using an intensifying process to enhance its flexibility and durability", and injected with a "special material up to an undisclosed depth to achieve a consistent hardness"; conventional Gorilla Glass is used for the back panels. The Z Flip is the first foldable smartphone to use a glass display, while previous foldable phones such as the Motorola Razr and the Galaxy Fold have used plastic displays. Using a glass display results in a more durable screen, and reduces the screen crease in the folding point. The hinge mechanism is strengthened with nylon fibers designed to keep dust out; Samsung rated the fold mechanism as supporting up to 200,000 uses. The device comes in 3 colors for the LTE version which are Mirror Purple, Mirror Black and Mirror Gold. It also comes in 2 colors for the 5G version which are Mystic Bronze and Mystic Gray. However, the color availability may vary depending on country or carrier. The Z Flip is also available in a Limited Edition Thom Browne model, featuring a red, white, and blue stripe on a gray base.

Hardware 
The device uses a clamshell design to conceal a 6.7" 21:9 Dynamic AMOLED display which supports HDR10+. The screen has a circular cutout at the top of the display for the front-facing camera. The exterior features a small 1.1" external display adjacent to the camera module, which can display the time, date and battery status, interact with notifications, answer phone calls and act as a viewfinder. The Qualcomm Snapdragon 855+ SoC and Adreno 640 GPU are utilized, with 8 GB of LPDDR4X RAM and 256 GB of non-expandable UFS 3.0 storage. It uses two batteries which have a total capacity of 3300 mAh, and can be recharged over USB-C at up to 15W wired or wirelessly via Qi. The power button is embedded in the frame and doubles as the fingerprint sensor, with the volume rocker located above. A dual camera setup on the rear has a 12 MP primary sensor and a 12 MP ultrawide sensor. The front-facing camera has a 10 MP sensor.

Software 

The Z Flip is pre-installed with Android 10 and Samsung's One UI 2 skin. Split-screen functionality, called "Flex mode" is supported with certain apps like YouTube and Google Duo.

Reception
The Z Flip was met with mixed to positive reviews at launch. It was praised for its flagship hardware, form factor, software/UI, display, and camera, but criticized for the price, size of the cover display, and perceived overall fragility. Sascha Segan of PC Magazine gave the Z Flip a 3/5, stating that "the Samsung Galaxy Z Flip is the first folding phone to really work, but it's still a costly and potentially fragile fashion object rather than a mainstream hit".

Jessica Dolcourt of CNET gave the Z Flip a 7.9/10, calling it "a cohesive device that's easy to pick up and use right away". Dolcourt called Flex Mode "the most unique, interesting and effective feature by far", while noting that battery life was just average and most multimedia was incompatible with the device's aspect ratio, resulting in pillarboxing. Chris Velazco of Engadget gave it a 78, praising the form factor, performance and cameras while criticizing the cover display and overall fragility.

Dieter Bohn of The Verge gave the Z Flip a 6/10, concluding that "as with previous folding phones it is more of an expensive experiment than a real product anybody should buy". Bohn praised the performance and hinge design, but was critical of the price and cameras, noting that the screen’s plastic covering was still susceptible to scratches. Samuel Gibbs of The Guardian praised the phone's durability, reporting that "the screen looks and works just as great today as it did fresh out of the box" despite being unfolded several dozen times each day for four months.

iFixit gave the device a repairability score of 2/10.

Gallery

See also
Huawei Mate X
Xiaomi Mi MIX Alpha
Motorola Razr (2020)

References

External links 
 

Mobile phones introduced in 2020
Android (operating system) devices
Mobile phones with multiple rear cameras
Foldable smartphones
Mobile phones with 4K video recording
Flip phones
Discontinued flagship smartphones
Samsung smartphones